Přílepy may refer to places in the Czech Republic:

Přílepy (Kroměříž District), a municipality and village in the Zlín Region
Přílepy (Rakovník District), a municipality and village in the Central Bohemian Region
Velké Přílepy, a municipality and village in the Central Bohemian Region